William H. Jones was a state legislator in Mississippi. He represented Issaquena County in the Mississippi House of Representatives from 1874 to 1877. He was a Republican.

See also
 African-American officeholders during and following the Reconstruction era

References

Republican Party members of the Mississippi House of Representatives
19th-century American politicians
Year of birth missing
Year of death missing